Afghanistan, participated in the 1951 Asian Games held in the city of New Delhi, India from 4 to 11 March 1951. Athletes from Afghanistan failed to secure any medal spot in these Games.

References

Nations at the 1951 Asian Games
1951
Asian Games
1951 in Afghan sport